Liancalus limbatus is a species in the family Dolichopodidae ("longlegged flies"), in the order Diptera ("flies").

References

Further reading

External links
Diptera.info

Hydrophorinae
Insects described in 1917